Eugubinus is a genus of thread-legged bug (Emesinae).

Partial species list 
 Eugubinus araneus
 Eugubinus intrudans
 Eugubinus reticolus

References 

Reduviidae
Cimicomorpha genera